Following the escalation of the Darfur conflict in the Sudan, Chad brokered negotiations in N'Djamena led to the Humanitarian Ceasefire Agreement between the Sudanese government and the two rebel groups, the Sudanese Justice and Equality Movement (JEM) and the Sudan Liberation Movement/Army (SLM/A) on 8 April 2004, other signatories were Chad and the African Union. The ceasefire came into effect on 11 April 2004.

The National Movement for Reform and Development — a group which splintered from the JEM in April did not participate in the cease-fire talks or the agreement. Janjaweed and rebel attacks have continued since the ceasefire.

The African Union formed a Ceasefire Commission (CFC) to monitor observance of the ceasefire.

References

Bibliography

External links
Text of the agreement

War in Darfur
Foreign relations of the African Union
2004 in Chad
Treaties of the Republic of the Sudan (1985–2011)
Treaties of Chad
African Union treaties
Treaties concluded in 2004
Treaties entered into force in 2004
Armistices
Ceasefires
April 2004 events in Africa